Xuan of Qi may refer to:

Duke Xuan of Qi (died 405 BC)
King Xuan of Qi (died 301 BC)